Jason Kevin Pearcey (born 23 July 1971) is an English former professional footballer and first team goalkeeping coach at Derby County

As a player he was a goalkeeper from 1989 until 2006. He played in the Football League for Mansfield Town, Grimsby Town and Brentford before ending his career in the Conference National with Forest Green Rovers. He came out of retirement the following year and continued to play at non-league level for Southam United, Leamington and Rugby Town.

Playing career
Pearcey started his professional career at Mansfield Town at the age of 18 (although being with the club since age 15). He left to join Grimsby Town with a £10,000 transfer fee and stayed for three and a half years before a Bosman ruling transfer to Brentford where Jason played for two and a half years.

It was during the 2000–01 season that he sustained a bad leg injury which ended his professional career although he made three appearances for Conference National Forest Green Rovers. He has since then kept playing at non-league level making appearances at Southam United, his home town team Leamington and his last club the Southern League Premier side Rugby Town.

Coaching career
Jason is now specialises in goalkeeper coaching in Worcestershire and the West Midlands. He is qualified to Level 3 Outfield and Level 3 Goalkeeping status. He is currently working as first team Goalkeeping coach at Derby County, replacing Shay Given, and for soccer academy Just4Keepers.

Honours

Grimsby Town
Second Division play-off winner: 1997–98
Football League Trophy winner: 1997–98
Mansfield Town – 2 promotions
Brentford – 1 promotion

References

External links 
 

1971 births
Living people
Sportspeople from Leamington Spa
English footballers
Association football goalkeepers
Mansfield Town F.C. players
Grimsby Town F.C. players
Brentford F.C. players
Forest Green Rovers F.C. players
Southam United F.C. players
Leamington F.C. players
Rugby Town F.C. players
English Football League players
National League (English football) players
Southern Football League players
Association football goalkeeping coaches